Persepolis is a 2007 adult animated biographical drama film based upon Marjane Satrapi's autobiographical graphic novel of the same name. It was written and directed by Satrapi in collaboration with Vincent Paronnaud. The story follows a young girl as she comes of age against the backdrop of the Iranian Revolution. The title references the historical city of Persepolis.
The film was an international co-production made by companies in France and Iran. It premiered at the 2007 Cannes Film Festival, where it co-won the Jury Prize, alongside Silent Light. It was released in France and Belgium on 27 June 2007, earning universal praise from critics. The film was selected as the French entry for the Best Foreign Language Film category at the 80th Academy Awards, and was nominated for Best Animated Feature.

Plot
At the Paris-Orly Airport in France, Marjane 'Marji' Satrapi looks at the flight schedule and reflects on her childhood.

During the 1979 Iranian revolution against the Shah of Iran, Marji's middle-class family participates in the rallies, though she is forbidden from attending. Marji's uncle Anoosh comes to dinner upon release from prison, inspiring Marji with stories of his life on the run from the government.

The Shah is deposed, and elections for a new leading power commence; Islamic fundamentalists win the elections and start imposing strict Islamic law, forcing women to dress "modestly" and wear headscarves. Anoosh is rearrested and executed for his political beliefs. Over time, many Iranians escape abroad.

The Iran–Iraq War breaks out, and the Iranian government takes away even more social freedoms. Marji's uncle Taher suffers a heart attack and must go to England for surgery, but only those approved by the Board of Health can leave the country. When Marji's aunt seeks permission, she finds that the hospital director is her former window washer, who is incompetent and submissive to religion. Marji and her father visit Khosro for a fake passport. Khosro is sheltering Niloufar, a woman wanted for her Communist beliefs. When Niloufar is caught and executed, Khosro flees. Taher dies. 

As she grows up, Marji buys heavy metal music on the black market and wears unorthodox clothing. When she rebuts a teacher's lies about government abuses, she is expelled. Fearing her arrest, her parents send her to a French lycée in Vienna to live with Catholic nuns. Marji makes few friends and feels isolated. After she insults a nun, she is thrown out. She moves from house to house until she rents a room from Dr. Frau Schloss, a former teacher.

One night, as she leaves a party where she lies about being French, Marji hears her grandmother's voice telling her to stay true to herself. Schloss accuses Marji of stealing, and Marji leaves. She spends the day on a park bench, reflecting upon her actions and realizing she has nowhere to go. After living on the street for a few months, she contracts bronchitis and almost dies. She awakens in a Viennese hospital. 

Marji returns to Iran with her family's hopes that the end of the war will improve their lives. She grows depressed, and attempts suicide by overdosing on medication. She attends university and starts dating fellow student Reza.

While waiting for Reza outside, Marji lies to a police officer to avoid arrest for wearing makeup. Her grandmother is disappointed and tells her that both her grandfather and her uncle died for freedom and that she should never sacrifice her integrity. Marji gives a speech during class, challenging the sexist double standard in the university's forum on public morality, but both Marji's and Reza's families are fined when the two are caught holding hands in public. Marji and Reza marry, but divorce a year later. 

The fundamentalist police raid a party that Marji is attending. The women are detained while the men escape across the rooftops. One of them, Nima, falls to his death. Marji decides to leave Iran. Before leaving, she visits the graves of her grandfather and uncle. Her mother forbids her from returning, and her grandmother dies soon after her departure.

In the present, Marji gets into a taxi. As it leaves the airport, the driver asks where she is from. She replies, "Iran". She recalls her final memory of her grandmother.

Cast
 Chiara Mastroianni as Marjane
 Catherine Deneuve as Mother

French version
 Gabriele Lopes as child Marjane
 Danielle Darrieux as Grandmother
 Simon Abkarian as Father
 François Jerosme as Uncle Anoush

English version
 Amethyste Frezignac as child Marjane
 Gena Rowlands as Grandmother
 Sean Penn as Father
 Iggy Pop as Uncle Anoush
 Mathilde Merlot as Tina / First Voice

Cinematography
The film is presented in the black-and-white style of the original graphic novels. Satrapi explains in a bonus feature on the DVD that this was so that the place and the characters would not look like foreigners in a foreign country but simply people in a country to show how easily a country can become like Iran. The present-day scenes are shown in color, while sections of the historic narrative resemble a shadow theater show. The design was created by art director and executive producer Marc Jousset. The animation is credited to the Perseprod studio and was created by two specialized studios, Je Suis Bien Content and Pumpkin 3D.

Animation and design
Directed by Christian Desmares, the film was produced by a total of twenty animators. Initially opposed to producing an animated movie due to the high level of difficulty, producers Marc-Antoine Robert and Xavier Regault gave protagonist, Marjane Satrapi, alternative options of film production to avoid animation. As admitted by producer Robert, "I know the new generation of French comic book artists quite well, and I'm afraid of Marjane's. I offered to write an original script for her, because I didn't want to work on an animated movie at all...I knew how complicated it was". And yet, despite the difficulty, the producers followed through with Satrapi's wishes and focused on interpreting her life story as depicted in her novel Persepolis, ""With live-action, it would have turned into a story of people living in a distant land who don't look like us," Satrapi says. "At best, it would have been an exotic story, and at worst, a 'third-world' story".

The animation team worked alongside Satrapi to gain a detailed understanding of the types of graphic images she deemed necessary for accuracy. Following her guidelines, the animators, such as interviewee Marc Jousset, commented on their use of the "tradition animation techniques" Satrapi requested to keep the drawings simple and avoid the "more high-tech techniques" that "would look dated". Satrapi's vision, according to Jousset, involved a lot of focus on the characters' natural, humane physical imperfections.

During their initial stages of production, the animation team attempted to use 2D image techniques "on pen tablets," but were immediately unsatisfied with the product due to the lack of definition, Jousset has said. Applying traditional techniques as simple as paper and ink to the production allowed Satrapi to use methods she was familiar with. As a result, Satrapi crafted an image depiction she, herself, would recognize as her own work, and thus, her own story. "It was clear that a traditional animation technique was perfectly suited to Marjane's and Vincent's idea of the film".

Choosing black and white as the film's dominant colors was an intentional choice by Satrapi, along with the director and animation team, to continue on the path of traditional animation techniques. Despite its simplicity, members of the animation team such as Jousset discussed how black and white makes imperfections more obvious: "Using only black and white in an animation movie requires a great deal of discipline. From a technical point of view, you can't make any mistakes...it shows up straight away on the large screen". In addition to color display, the animation team worked especially hard on techniques that mimicked the styles of Japanese cartoonists, known as "manga," and translating them into their own craft of "a specific style, both realistic and mature. No bluffing, no tricks, nothing overcooked". According to Jousset, "Marjane had quite an unusual way of working...Marjane insisted on being filmed playing out all the scenes...it was a great source of information for the animators, giving them an accurate approach to how they should work". With this in mind, the animators commented on the immense hardships they faced when creating each image of "1,200 shots" through Satrapi's perspective because even though "Marjane's drawings looked very simple and graphic...they're very difficult to work on because there are so few identifying marks. Realistic drawings require outstanding accuracy". Despite the difficulties in working with animation film, however, Satrapi's drive and determination to make the film motivated the animators to finish each graphic image with full accuracy. Following alongside a more traditional style of graphic imagery was not only difficult in terms of drawing, but also in terms of locating a team to draw the images since traditional animators "hardly exist in France anymore". With a group of more than 100 people, though, animator Pascal Chevé confirmed the variety of style each team member brought to the table: "An animator will be more focused on trying to make the character move in the right way. Assistant animators will then put the final touches to the drawings to make sure they're true to the original. Then the 'trace' team comes in, and they work on each drawing with...a felt pen, to ensure that they are consistent with the line that runs throughout the movie".

Although it was hard to craft realistic cartoon drawings, Jousset said the biggest challenge was staying on schedule and within budget of "6 million Euros, which is reasonable for a 2D movie made in France", but that "I think the culmination of the fact that it was a true story, that the main character worked with you, that an animated movie dealt with a current issue and that it was intended for adults was tremendously exciting for the team".

Release
The film premiered at the 2007 Cannes Film Festival on 23 May 2007, where it co-won the Jury Prize, alongside Silent Light. In her acceptance speech, director Marjane Satrapi said: "Although this film is universal, I wish to dedicate the prize to all Iranians."

Reception

Critical response

Review aggregator website Rotten Tomatoes gives the film an approval rating of 96% based on 162 reviews, with an average rating of 8.20/10. The site's consensus reads: "Persepolis is an emotionally powerful, dramatically enthralling autobiographical gem, and the film's simple black-and-white images are effective and bold". Metacritic gives the film a weighted average score of 90 out of 100 based on 31 reviews, indicating "universal acclaim".

Roger Ebert of the Chicago Sun-Times gave the film four stars out of four, writing that although its black and white animation "may sound Spartan", it is "surprisingly involving" and that Satrapi's story is told "caringly, lovingly and with great style". He added, "while so many films about coming of age involve manufactured dilemmas, here is one about a woman who indeed does come of age, and magnificently."

Time magazine's Richard Corliss named the film one of the Top 10 Movies of 2007, ranking it #6, and called it "a coming-of-age tale that manages to be both harrowing and exuberant".

It has been ranked No. 58 in Empire magazine's "The 100 Best Films of World Cinema" in 2010.

International government reaction
The film has drawn complaints from the Iranian government. Even before its debut at the 2007 Cannes Film Festival, the government-connected Iran Farabi Foundation sent a letter to the French embassy in Tehran reading, "This year the Cannes Film Festival, in an unconventional and unsuitable act, has chosen a movie about Iran that has presented an unrealistic face of the achievements and results of the glorious Islamic Revolution in some of its parts." Despite such objections, the Iranian cultural authorities relented in February 2008 and allowed limited screenings of the film in Tehran, albeit with six scenes censored due to sexual content.

In June 2007 in Thailand, the film was dropped from the lineup of the Bangkok International Film Festival. Festival director Chattan Kunjara na Ayudhya said, "I was invited by the Iranian embassy to discuss the matter and we both came to mutual agreement that it would be beneficial to both countries if the film was not shown" and "It is a good movie in artistic terms, but we have to consider other issues that might arise here."

Persepolis was initially banned in Lebanon after some clerics found it "offensive to Iran and Islam." The ban was later revoked after an outcry in Lebanese intellectual and political circles.

Screening controversies
On 7 October 2011, the film was shown on the Tunisian private television station Nessma. A day later a demonstration formed and marched on the station. The main Islamic party in Tunisia, Ennahda, condemned the demonstration. Nabil Karoui, the owner of Nessma TV, faced trial in Tunis on charges of "violating sacred values" and "disturbing the public order." He was found guilty and ordered to pay a fine of 2,400 dinars ($1,700; £1,000), a much more lenient punishment than predicted. Amnesty International said that criminal proceedings against Karoui are an affront to freedom of expression.

Awards

 80th Academy Awards
 Nominated: Best Animated Feature. Additionally, it is the first traditionally animated nominee since 2005's Howl's Moving Castle. It was also France's Best Foreign Language Film entry, but was not nominated.

 65th Golden Globe Awards
 Nominated: Best Foreign Language Film
 62nd British Academy Film Awards
 Nominated: Best Film Not in the English Language
 Nominated: Best Animated Film
 35th Annie Awards
 Nominated: Best Animated Feature
 Nominated: Directing in an Animated Feature Production
 Nominated: Music in an Animated Feature Production
 Nominated: Writing in an Animated Feature Production
 33rd César Awards
 Won: Best First Feature Film (Vincent Paronnaud and Marjane Satrapi)
 Won: Best Writing – Adaptation (Vincent Paronnaud and Marjane Satrapi)
 Nominated: Best Editing (Stéphane Roche)
 Nominated: Best Film
 Nominated: Best Music Written for a Film (Olivier Bernet)
 Nominated: Best Sound (Samy Bardet, Eric Chevallier and Thierry Lebon)

2007 Cannes Film Festival
 Tied: Jury Prize
 Nominated: Palme d'Or

20th European Film Awards
 Nominated: Best Film

3rd Globes de Cristal Award
 Won: Best Film

2007 London Film Festival
 Southerland Trophy (Grand prize of the festival)

2007 Cinemanila International Film Festival
 Special Jury Prize

2007 São Paulo International Film Festival
 Won: Best Foreign Language Film

2007 Vancouver International Film Festival
 Won: Rogers People's Choice Award for Most Popular International Film

2009 Silver Condor Awards
 Won: Silver Condor Award for Best Foreign Film

See also
 Iranian cinema
 List of animated feature-length films
 List of films based on French-language comics
 Arthouse animation
 Independent animation

References

Further reading

External links

 
 
 
 
 
 
 
 Persepolis at Film Education

2007 films
2000s French-language films
2000s English-language films
2000s Persian-language films
2000s German-language films
2007 animated films
2000s biographical drama films
2007 comedy-drama films
2000s French animated films
French biographical drama films
French black-and-white films
French comedy-drama films
French independent films
Animated comedy films
Animated coming-of-age films
Animated drama films
Animated films based on comics
Best First Feature Film César Award winners
2000s feminist films
Films based on autobiographical novels
Films based on French comics
Films directed by Marjane Satrapi
Films directed by Vincent Paronnaud
Films set in Iran
Films set in the 1970s
Films set in the 1980s
Films set in the 1990s
Iranian Revolution films
The Kennedy/Marshall Company films
Sony Pictures Classics animated films
Sony Pictures Classics films
Film controversies
Obscenity controversies in animation
Obscenity controversies in film
Film controversies in Iran
Film controversies in Thailand
Film controversies in Lebanon
Films partially in color
Censored films
Films set in Vienna
2007 multilingual films
Films about puberty
French adult animated films
2000s American films